Niphargidae is a family of amphipod crustaceans. Its distribution is in western Eurasia, and its members mainly live in subterranean freshwaters habitats. It contains the following genera:
Carinurella Sket, 1971
Foroniphargus G. Karaman, 1985
Haploginglymus Mateus & Mateus, 1958
Microniphargus Schellenberg, 1934
Niphargellus Schellenberg, 1938
Niphargobates Sket, 1981
Niphargopsis Chevreux, 1922 (synonym of Niphargus)
Niphargus Schiødte, 1847
Pontoniphargus Dancău, 1970

References

External links

 
Crustacean families